was the younger of two Japanese photographers to bear that name.

Suzuki's original name was Okamoto Keizō  and he was born in Izu. From an early age he enjoyed drawing and painting, and at thirteen or fourteen he set off for Yokohama determined to become an artist. He became a student of the artist Charles Wirgman, a friend and former partner of the photographer Felice Beato. On seeing a photograph of a wrestler, Okamoto was so taken with the detail and image quality of the novel medium that he decided to become a photographer. He learned photography at the Yokohama photographic studio of Shimooka Renjō, where he worked for a number of years from 1870, and where he met his future father-in-law, Suzuki Shin'ichi I who was also apprenticed to Shimooka. In 1873 Okamoto married Suzuki's daughter Nobu, and — by the custom known as muko-iri — moved into the Suzuki family, adopting the father's name. (The older photographer thereupon changed his own name.)

In 1876 Okamoto, now Suzuki, left Shimooka's studio, perhaps to work in a photographic studio in Nagoya, and then under Yokoyama Matsusaburō, and in 1879 went to San Francisco, where he studied negative retouching and other skills under I. W. Taber, thereby perhaps becoming the first Japanese photographer to study abroad. On his return to Japan, he became the successful operator of his father-in-law's new branch studio in Kudanzaka, Tokyo. His photographs, often large hand-coloured albumen prints, won prizes at international exhibitions in Europe and Japan and he was commissioned to photograph such persons of rank as the Hawaiian King Kalākaua in 1881, the Crown Prince Tōgu in 1888 (for which he was paid $50), and the Japanese Empress Dowager in 1890. In the same year, Suzuki was commissioned by the Japanese government to produce photographic albums of views along the Tōkaidō to be presented to Tsarevich Nicholas Alexandrovich of Russia (later Tsar Nicholas II). When the Tsarevich's visit to Japan was cut short following an attempt on his life, the albums were instead presented to Russia and Greece. Similar photographic albums were given to senior officials in the United States and Europe. In spite of this success, there is no record of the Suzuki studio in Tokyo after 1903. Since 1893, the Yokohama studio established by his father-in-law had been operated by I. S. Suzuki — that is, Izaburō, the son of Suzuki Shin'ichi I — and it continued operation until 1908.

After the Russo-Japanese War, Suzuki made an unfortunate investment in the transport industry, and the family was ruined. Suzuki died some time later, in 1912.

Notes

References
 Bennett, Terry. Old Japanese Photographs: Collector's Data Guide. London: Quaritch, 2006.  (hard)
 Bennett, Terry. Photography in Japan: 1853–1912. Rutland, Vt: Charles E. Tuttle, 2006.  (hard)
 Clark, John, John Fraser, and Colin Osman. "A revised chronology of Felice (Felix) Beato (1825/34?–1908?)". In Japanese Exchanges in Art, 1850s to 1930s with Britain, Continental Europe, and the USA: Papers and Research Materials. Sydney: Power Publications, 2001.  (paper)
 Isawa, Y. 'Sketches of the Lives of a Few of the Leading Professional Photographers in Japan', in 'Photographers and Photography in Japan' by W. K. Burton; reproduced from The Practical Photographer (September 1896, vol. viii, no. 81), in Bennett, OJP.
Kaneko Ryūichi. "Suzuki Shin'ichi". Nihon shashinka jiten (日本写真家事典) / 328 Outstanding Japanese Photographers. Kyoto: Tankōsha, 2000. . P.186.  Despite the English-language alternative title, all in Japanese. The article is primarily about Suzuki Shin'ichi I.
Nihon no shashin: Uchinaru katachi, sotonaru katachi 1: Torai kara 1945 made (日本の写真　内なるかたち・外なるかたち 1 渡来から1945まで) / Japanese Photography: Form In/Out 1: From Its Introduction to 1945. Tokyo: Tokyo Metropolitan Museum of Photography, 1996.  Exhibition catalogue. Text and captions in Japanese and English. A group portrait of students of a women's college of education appears as plate 55.
Nihon no shashinka (日本の写真家) / Biographic Dictionary of Japanese Photography. Tokyo: Nichigai Associates, 2005. . P.224.  Despite the English-language alternative title, all in Japanese.
 Palmquist, Peter E., and Thomas R. Kailbourn. Pioneer Photographers of the Far West: A Biographical Dictionary, 1840-1865. Stanford, Calif.: Stanford University Press, 2000.  (hard)
 Yokoe, Fuminori. 'Part 3-3. Yokoyama Matsusaburo (1838-1884).' In The Advent of Photography in Japan/Shashin torai no koro, Tokyo Metropolitan Museum of Photography, and Hakodate Museum of Art, Hokkaido, eds. (Tokyo: Tokyo Metropolitan Foundation for History and Culture; Tokyo Metropolitan Museum of Photography; Hokkaido: Hakodate Museum of Art, 1997).

External links
 1875 in photography. Contains specific biographical information on Okamoto that does not appear elsewhere (and has not been incorporated within this article). However, no source for this is specified.

Japanese photographers
1855 births
1912 deaths
Place of birth unknown
Place of death unknown